Dom Capuano (born Domenico Capuano 21 April 1975), is an Italian music composer and producer of pop music, electronic dance music and orchestra.

His breakthrough as a producer and songwriter arrived in the mid to late 1990s after crafting a string of hits for pop artists like Eiffel 65, Da Blitz, Gabry Ponte and Karmah. He has also collaborated with several international artists including: Toni Braxton, S Club 7, Busta Rhymes, Jean Michel Jarre, Kool & The Gang, Laura Pausini, 883, Aqua. Zucchero, Nek, Andreas Johnson, Alphaville.

Early life and career
He studied music, in particular double bass at the G. Verdi Conservatory of Music in Turin, Italy. He is also a piano player, composer and conductor. His entire musical career can be split into two different paths: the recording industry and symphonic music.

In the early 1990s, he succeeded as a composer and record music producer and he is now considered a "successful composer on the mainstream" due to his continuous "maniacal" research and experimentation of new sounds.

Over the years, he has composed and produced many hits. In 1993, he composed "Let Me Be" launching the career of Da Blitz. (#11 in Italian charts). In 1994, he composed "Take My Way".

As a composer and arranger for DaBlitz, he has entered repeatedly Italian charts with "Let Me Be" and "Stay with Me" (which eventually reached the 1st position). Da Blitz will be in the standings again with the songs "Movin' On" and "Take Me Back" (which both peaked at number 4) and "I Believe" (which got to number 8 )

Worldwide recognition
The album Europop by Eiffel 65 was released in US by Universal reaching the 4th position of U.S. charts by selling a total of 3,800,000 copies. Europop was also released worldwide with different record labels including Warner Music and Sony Music, receiving good reviews from the American press (Ref: Pop Matters , Entertainment Weekly   All Music )

Eiffel 65 received a Grammy Awards Nomination in 2001(source: Rockonthenet ) and their track "Move Your Body" was played at the World Music Awards of Montecarlo in 2000, in front of a VIP audience hall, that included Mariah Carey and Michael Jackson. In 2002 international press recognised the market distribution of Eiffel 65 as 15 million units sold worldwide including albums and singles.

In 2000 and 2001, Dom remixed more than 40 songs for various international artists including "Tout est Bleu" by Jean Michel Jarre which co-produced the song step by step together with him. Dom says that it was a huge honor to collaborate with Mr. Jarre and it was one of the best satisfactions of his entire life since he had studied years before electronic music having non-other than Jean Michel Jarre and Mike Oldfield as references.

Over the years, Dom has produced also remixes for the Italian band 883 including, "Come Mai", "La Donna, Il Sogno e Il Grande Incubo", "Gli Anni" credited by Bliss Team and also "Viaggio al centro del mondo" and the hit "La Regina del Celebrità" credited by Eiffel 65.

Between 2002 and 2005, Dom collaborated with Gabry Ponte producing and writing songs like "The Man in the Moon" and "Depends on You" from the albums "Doctor Jekyll & Mr. DJ". From the album "Gabry Ponte" was extracted the single "Figli di Pitagora" performed by Italian Rock'n' Roll Legend "Little Tony". Both albums were released by Universal Italy and both reached the top of national rankings. (source: HitParadeItalia 2002  ).

In 2005, at Bliss Corporation, Dom produced, with Gabry Ponte, several tracks for the band "Karmah" which experienced quite a big success in Europe (mainly in Germany) peaking at #5 with a cover of SOS' "Just Be Good to Me" which contained a sample of the song "Every Breath You Take" by The Police.

Italian pop music
In the summer of 2006, Dom met the band Dari and began an artistic collaboration as producer and co-author of some of their songs. In February 2008 the band achieved success in Italy with the song "Wale (Tanto Wale)". Soon after he received the following awards: the Italian Revelation video of the year for the track wALE (tANTo wALE) in 2008; 2 MTV TRL Awards in 2009 as "Best New Artist" and 2010 for the "Best Look".

In 2010, Capuano has produced the Rock band "Fonokit". In the same year he completed his music studies as conductor, which gave him the input to move to the US to pursue his passion for movies and soundtracks. (source: Imdb )

Film scoring and Hollywood
In 2006, a new chapter began with the study of music composition for cinema and in 2008 Dom produces his first real and complete work for a 45 minutes film, "Calibro 70", directed by Alessandro Rota. (source: Imdb ). The film won some international film festivals (source: Imdb ). In 2009 he composed the soundtrack "Hey Gio" for the Disney Channel TV series "Chiamatemi Gio" (an Italian revision of "Ugly Betty"). (source: Imdb ).

After the soundtracks of Ninja Turtles and some other short films, in 2011 he moved to Los Angeles to pursue his career as a composer for film.

In 2011, Dom composed and produced the soundtrack for the Australian film "The Sleeping Warrior". (Source: Imdb ) which treats a philosophical-political issue and was directed by the Indian filmmaker Chayan Sarkar. In 2012 he composed and produced the soundtrack for the American film "Solid State" (source: Imdb ) starring Vivica A. Fox.

He composed and produced the second episode of the trilogy directed by Stefano Milla "Richard The Lionheart: Rebellion": a story on the vicissitudes of the rise to the throne of the future King of England Richard I "the Lionheart", son of Henry II of England and Eleanor of Aquitaine. (Source: Imdb ). With a first release in 2015 the film eventually got distributed by STUDIOCANAL for the UE and Sony Pictures for the U.S. In the same year he composed the soundtrack of the TV movie "Beautiful Destroyer". (Source: Imdb )

Dom is still composing for films and in 2016 he scored "The Silent Lynx" and "Branded" directed by Phil Gorn starring the London twins, Jeremy and James London, known for several TV series that have brought them to prominence in the '90s and Christopher Showerman, famous for his role in "George of the jungle" by Disney. (Source: Imdb )

Among his most appreciated collaborations there is "Kingdom of Gladiators, the Tournament" a film about fights and gladiators starring the hero of the WWF and WWE wrestling walk of fame star Solofa Fatu Jr. better known as Rikishi. (Source: Imdb )

In 2018, Enter the Fire starring Lou Ferrigno, had been released. The music scored by Dom Capuano is a revolutionary concept of soundscape and techno music which drives the movie to another level of soundtrack experience.

Other works
Always close to the academies and education, Dom composed numerous short films for students of American universities such as: USC University of Southern California, UCLA University of California Los Angeles, NYFA (New York Film Academy), AFI, (HIFA) Hollywood International Film Academy (source: Imdb ), (source: Imdb  )

Awards
With the album Europop he obtained a triple platinum award in the U.S. (certified RIAA) with over 3 million sales which include the song "Move Your Body" by Eiffel 65 and reaching over 10 million in sales worldwide. The single "Move Your Body" archived 3 Platinums in Australia, France and Germany, 2 Golds in UK and Austria with a total amount of over 1,500,000 sales. He also received other several gold awards with Da Blitz (6 golds in Italy and 1 in Spain), Gabry Ponte (2 golds), Karmah (2 golds in Germany)

Discography

Albums
Selected albums from sales chart rankings:
1999 – Europop – Eiffel 65
2001 – Contact! – Eiffel 65
2003 – Eiffel 65 – Eiffel 65
2002 – Gabry Ponte – Gabry Ponte
2004 – Dr. Jekyll and Mr. DJ – Gabry Ponte
2006 – Be Good to Me – Karmah
2008 – sOtToVuOtO GeNeRaZiOnAlE – dARI
2008 – Gabry2o – Gabry Ponte
2009 – sOtToVuOtO D-Version – dARI
2010 – In Testa – dARI
2011 – Amore o Purgatorio – Fonokit

Singles
Selected singles from sales chart rankings:
1993 – "Let Me Be" – N.1 Italy Dance Charts
1994 – "Take My Way" – N.1 Italy Dance Charts
1995 – "Stay with Me" – N.1 Italy Pop Charts, – N.70 European Hot 100 Singles
1995 – "Movin' On" – N.94 European Hot 100 Singles
1995 – "Take Me Back" – N.75 European Hot 100 Singles
1995 – "You Make Me Cry" – N.1 Italy Dance Charts
2000 – "Move Your Body" – N.1 by 20 country in the World such USA, Germany, France and UK
2000 – "Europop" – N.3 Top Album Billboard Charts USA – 52 weeks on chart – 3x RIAA Platinum in the USA alone –  more than 10 million sales worldwide.
2003 – "Quelli che non Hanno Età" – (Sanremo 2003) N.1 Italy Dance Charts N.3 Italy Top Charts
2004 – "The Man in The Moon" Italian Hit Performed by DJ Gabry Ponte N.1 Italy Dance Charts
2006 – "Ninja Turtles" – TV Cartoon Theme Soundtrack
2006 – "Just Be Good to Me" – N.1 Germany Top Charts
2008 – "Wale (Tanto Wale)" – Italian Hit by Dari – N.2 Italy Top Charts
2009 – "Non pensavo" – "dARI"' and "Max Pezzali" N.16 Italy Pop Charts
2009 – "Cercasi AAAmore" – N.9 Italy Pop Charts
2009 – "Casa casa mia" – N.15 Italy Pop Charts
2011 – "Non Esiste" – N.45 Italy Pop Charts
2017 – "Tu" – "Gabry Ponte feat. Umberto Tozzi"
2018 – "I Think I Love You" – N.41 Billboard Dance Charts – 6 weeks on chart

Solo albums and EP
2012 – The Journey to The Sacred Places (vo.1)
2012 – The Chinese Power
2013 – Lifexence
2014 – Zombeat in a Solid State
2016 – The Chinese Power 2016
2017 – TrailerTunes

Soundtracks and film scoring
1998 – Poken Monster – Pokémon TV Theme Taiwan
2006 – Mutant Ninja Turtles (Ninja Turtles TV Theme) – TV RTI
2008 – AfterVille – The Underground Exhibition Movie, Turin
2008 – Calibro 70
2009 – Hey Giò (Chiamatemi Giò)  – TV Theme – The Italian Edition of Ugly Betty by Disney Channel 
2011 – Lourdes (Documentary)
2012 – The Sleeping Warrior
2013 – The Solid State
2014 – Beautiful Destroyer
2015 – Richard the Lionheart: Rebellion
2016 – Branded
2017 – Kingdom of Gladiators, the Tournament
2018 – Enter The Fire

Remixes and cooperations
Tout est Bleu – Jean Michel Jarre in collaboration with Jean Michel Jarre
All Over – Onyx ft Busta Rhymes
Freaky Friday – Aqua
Reach – S Club 7
The Bad Touch – Bloodhound Gang
Get Down On It RMX – Kool & The Gang
Il mio sbaglio più grande – Laura Pausini
Big in Japan RMX – Alphaville
Come Mai – 883
La Donna il Sogno e Il Grande Incubo – 883
La Regina Del Celebrità – 883
Viaggio al Centro Del Mondo – 883
Everyone Has Inside – Gala
Ring My Bell – Ann Lee
Paradise – Simone Jay
Anywhere – Peach
U Gotta Be – Alex Party
Little Girl – Lilù
Thinkin' Of You – Super Eva
You And Me – Regina
All I Really Want – Kim Lukas
Who Let The Dogs Out? – Baha Men
Glorious – Andreas Johnson
Black And White – Ana Bettz
Thinkin Of You – Supereva
Here Comes The Sunshine – Love Inc.

Awards
 RIAA 3× Platinum (2000)
 Bundesverband Musikindustrie Platinum (2000)
 ARIA Platinum and Gold (2000–2001)
 SNEP Platinum (2000)

See also
Europop (album)

References

An Italian interview with Capuano (in Italian)

Jean Michel Jarre – Tout Est Bleu

External links

1975 births
Living people
Musicians from Turin
Italian record producers
Italian male film score composers
Video game composers